The 3d Medical Battalion (3D MED BN) is a medical support unit of the United States Marine Corps and is headquartered at Camp Foster, Okinawa, Japan.  The unit falls under the command of 3rd Marine Logistics Group.

Current units
 Headquarters and Service Company
 Alpha Company
 Bravo Company (MCB Hawaii)

Mission
To provide direct and general Health Service Support to III MEF in order to sustain the combat effort across the full spectrum of MAGTF operations.

History

Lineage
1942-1945
3D Medical Battalion was activated 12 August 1942 at San Diego, California, as the 3D Medical Battalion and assigned to the 2D Marine Division. In September 1942 reassigned to the 3D Marine Division. Deployed during February-March 1943 to Auckland, New Zealand. Redeployed during March-April 1945 to Guam. The unit was deactivated 1 December 1945.

1952-2009
3D Medical Battalion was reactivated 5 March 1952 at Camp Pendleton, California, and assigned to the 3D Marine Division as before. Deployed during August 1953 to Camp Gifu, Japan. Redeployed during March 1956 to Camp Hauge, Okinawa. Redeployed during June 1965 to Da Nang, Republic of Vietnam. Re assigned during July 1979 to 3D Force Service Support Group.

During the Tsunami disaster in Sri Lanka and Indonesia, elements of 3D FSSG assisted from December 2004 - February 2005. Elements also participated in humanitarian relief efforts in Pakistan during October 2006 - March 2006.

Reassigned during July 2007 to Combat Logistics Regiment 35, 3D Marine Logistics Group.

World War II
3D Medical Battalion participated in the following WWII campaigns. Bougainville, Solomon Islands, Guam, and Iwo Jima.

Vietnam War
The battalion participated in the following operations during The war in Vietnam. Da Nang, Chu Lai, Phu Bai, Dong Ha, and Quang Tri. The unit was departed South Vietnam on 24 November 1969, redeploying to Okinawa.

The Gulf War and the 1990s
In the mid 1990s 3rd Medical Battalion part of 3rd Force Service Support Group (FSSG) was headquartered at Camp Hansen with H&S Co, and Bravo Company on site, Charlie Company was located on Camp Schwab.  Hospital Corpsmen from both Bravo and Charlie Companies manned the Medical Clinics and Ambulances providing medical support to Marine Forces on both camps.

Members deployed as part of the 31st MEU and participated in various operations and training in the Pacific Rim.

Operation Enduring Freedom and Iraqi Freedom
During the wars in Afghanistan and Iraq elements of 3D FSSG participated in operations from March 2004-March 2005 and March 2007 - June 2008.

COVID-19 Pandemic 
In April 2020, A detachment was sent to Guam to assist the outbreak aboard the USS Theodore Roosevelt. "“The rapid response by the 3rd MLG was incredible...Their footprint ashore will ensure our Sailors off ship are well cared for.” - Rear Adm. Stu Baker, commander, Carrier Strike Group Nine.

Task Force (TF) Medical's response force was made up of 90 Marines and Sailors assigned to 3rd Marine Logistics Group out of Okinawa, Japan. In total they cared for 850 COVID-19 positive service members. Lt. Cmdr. Jennifer Knapp was the officer in charge and uniquely, compared to the force makeup, all 4 program leads were female.

Honors awarded

Presidential Unit Citation streamer. Vietnam 1965-1967

Navy Unit Commendation streamer with four bronze stars. World War II: Iwo Jima -1945, Vietnam 1965-1966, 1968, 1980-1984, 1985-1987

Meritorious Unit Commendation streamer with one bronze star. 1989-1991, 2004-2005

Asiatic-Pacific Campaign streamer with four bronze stars

World War II Victory streamer

National Defense Service streamer with three bronze stars

Korean Service streamer

Vietnam Service streamer with two silver and one bronze star

Global War on Terrorism Service streamer

Vietnam Cross of Gallantry with Palm streamer

See also

 History of the United States Marine Corps
 List of United States Marine Corps battalions

References

External links
 Battalion's official website

 USMC Unit History

Med 3